The Segni I Cabinet was the 11th cabinet of the Italian government which held office from 6 July 1955 until 20 May 1957, for a total of 683 days, or 1 year, 10 months and 13 days.

Following the resignation of the previous government, chaired by Mario Scelba and caused by internal clashes with the DC and by the PRI's refusal to return to the government, the President of the Republic Gronchi, on 26 June 1955, instructed Antonio Segni to start consultations with the parties to explore the possibilities of the formation of a new government and, having obtained the approval of the DC, PSDI and PLI and external support from the PRI, on 2 July, he was entrusted with the task of forming the new government. The program was presented first to the Chamber which, on 18 July, approved the motion of confidence with 293 votes in favor and 265 against while, in the Senate, it was approved on 22 July with 121 votes in favor and 100 against.

Following the departure of the PSDI from the government, Segni presented his resignation to Gronchi on 6 May 1957.

Government parties
The government was composed by the following parties:

Party breakdown
 Christian Democracy (DC): prime minister, 14 ministers and 31 undersecretaries
 Italian Democratic Socialist Party (PSDI): deputy prime minister, 3 ministers and 5 undersecretaries
 Italian Liberal Party (PLI): 3 ministers and 4 undersecretaries

Composition

References

Italian governments
1955 establishments in Italy
1957 disestablishments in Italy
Cabinets established in 1955
Cabinets disestablished in 1957